The Frozen Ground is a 2013 American thriller film directed and written by Scott Walker, in his directorial debut, starring Nicolas Cage, John Cusack, Vanessa Hudgens, Katherine LaNasa, Radha Mitchell, and 50 Cent. Based on the crimes of the real-life Alaskan serial killer Robert Hansen, the film depicts an Alaskan State Trooper seeking to apprehend Hansen by partnering with a young woman who escaped from Hansen's clutches.

The film was released in select theaters and directly to video on demand on August 23, 2013, and received mixed reviews from critics, although Cage's performance was cited as a highlight.

Plot
In an Anchorage motel room in 1983, 17-year-old Cindy Paulson (Vanessa Hudgens) is handcuffed and screaming for help. She is rescued by an Anchorage Police Department patrol officer. He takes Paulson to the hospital, and her clothes are kept for a rape kit. At an APD station, she explains to detectives that she was abducted and raped. Because she is a prostitute and lying about her age, the detectives do not believe her story, refusing to even look into the man whom she named as her abductor, Robert Hansen (John Cusack). They claim Hansen is an upstanding member of society, a family man who owns his own restaurant, with alibis from three people.

The APD patrol officer who rescued Paulson is outraged that the detectives refuse to pursue Hansen. He surreptitiously photocopies information about the case and sends it to the Alaska State Troopers. Meanwhile, state trooper Jack Halcombe (Nicolas Cage) has been called to investigate a female body that was found in the bush, half eaten by bears. The police connect the case to other missing girls, who have disappeared after going to what they thought were legitimate photo shoots. With secret information from the APD officer, Halcombe connects the other cases to Paulson's and begins constructing a profile of Hansen. Paulson details how Hansen kept her captive and that she escaped from his car when he tried to transfer her to his bush plane.

Meanwhile, in Anchorage, Debbie Peters gets picked up by a man in an RV for a photo shoot. Later, Hansen eats a quiet dinner at home. His wife and children are away, and Hansen relaxes in his trophy room, casually ignoring Peters who is chained to a post. She has urinated on the floor, and as she cleans up the mess with a towel, Hansen's neighbor enters the house to deliver a plate of food. Hansen warns Peters not to scream and leaves the trophy room to greet his neighbor. Hansen then takes Peters to the airport, where he orders her into his plane. After landing in a remote spot in the bush, Hansen frees Peters, letting her run in a panic through the woods before he shoots her with a .223 caliber rifle. He steals her necklace before finishing her off with a handgun.

Halcombe has a very difficult time assembling a case against Hansen. Because the evidence is circumstantial and Paulson is afraid to testify, the district attorney refuses to issue a search warrant. Paulson keeps falling back into the world of stripping and prostitution, despite Halcombe's efforts to keep her safe. At a strip club, while she is trying to sell lap dances, she notices Hansen trawling for a new victim. Their eyes meet, a chase ensues, and Paulson barely escapes. The encounter makes Hansen nervous, and he hires Carl Galenski to find and kill Paulson. Carl approaches Paulson's erstwhile pimp Clate Johnson (50 Cent) and offers to forgive his sizable debt if Clate turns Paulson over to him.

Halcombe stakes out Hansen's house, causing Hansen to panic. Hansen gathers the evidence of his crimes, including the keepsakes from his victims, and flees with his son to the airport. Despite dangerous flying conditions, he flies his plane to the bush and hides his keepsakes.

Feeling that the chance to catch Hansen is slipping away, and with the victim count now at 17 girls, Halcombe forces the DA to issue a warrant. The search of Hansen's house yields no evidence, not even in his trophy room. Hansen agrees to be interrogated without a lawyer, but he is not yielding any new evidence. Halcombe arrests Hansen, but unless the police find new evidence, they will be unable to hold him.

Halcombe orders a second search of Hansen's house, which turns up a hidden cache of guns, including the .223 caliber rifle used in many of the murders. Under police watch at a safe location, Paulson slips away and returns to her life of prostitution. Clate delivers her to Carl. When Clate attempts to rob Carl, Paulson uses the opportunity to escape, with Carl in pursuit after killing Clate. After making a call to Halcombe, Paulson is almost killed by Carl, but Halcombe rescues her just in time.

Halcombe uses a bracelet identical to one worn by one of the victims  to trick Hansen into thinking the police have found the evidence he'd hidden in the bush. The bracelet, combined with the sight of Paulson in the interrogation room, enrages Hansen to the point that he incriminates himself.

The epilogue states that Hansen confessed to the murders of 17 women, and the kidnappings and rapes of another 30. He was charged with the abduction and rape of Cindy Paulson, and the murders of Joanna Messina, Sherry Morrow, Paula Goulding, and "Eklutna Annie". He was sentenced to 461 years plus life without parole.

The film ends with a dedication to and photographs of Hansen's victims.

Cast

Production

The film was shot in 26 days, entirely in Alaska. Writer/director Scott Walker delayed shooting for five months so he could shoot the film on the cusp of fall into winter, so he could achieve a look and feel of the film starting with no snow and ending in the deep of winter. He has said he literally wanted the feel of the weather closing in and around the story, and freezing the case. As a result of shooting at this time of year, by the end of 26 days' filming there were 3 1/2 hours less daylight per day than when filming began.

Reception
On Rotten Tomatoes the film holds an approval rating of 61% based on 57 reviews, with an average rating of 5.2/10. The website's critics consensus reads: "Though this by-the-numbers true procedural seems basic, The Frozen Ground presents a welcome return for Nicolas Cage in a solid performance." Metacritic assigned the film a weighted average score of 37 out of 100, based on 16 critics, indicating "generally unfavorable reviews".

Cage won the Ischia Legend Award at Ischia Film Festival.

In August 2020, the film was added to Netflix and quickly became the number one most streamed movie the week of September 5, 2020, joining an emerging crop of other feature films which have received lukewarm receptions upon their initial release only to garner surprising new attention when added to the massive streaming platform.

References

External links
 
 
 

2013 films
2013 crime thriller films
2010s serial killer films
2013 thriller drama films
American crime thriller films
American serial killer films
American thriller drama films
Biographical films about serial killers
Films set in 1983
Films set in Alaska
Films shot in Alaska
MoviePass Films films
Lionsgate films
Films about rape
Thriller films based on actual events
Films scored by Lorne Balfe
2013 directorial debut films
2013 drama films
2010s English-language films
2010s American films